Afromeroplius is a genus of flies in the family Sepsidae.

Species
Afromeroplius semlikiensis (Vanschuytbroeck, 1963)
Afromeroplius watalingaensis (Vanschuytbroeck, 1963)

References

Sepsidae
Diptera of Africa
Brachycera genera